The Fussball Club Basel 1893 1992–93 season was their 100th anniversary season since the club's foundation. Peter Epting took over as the club's chairman that season from Charles Röthlisberger at the Annual General Meeting in March 1993. FC Basel played their home games in the St. Jakob Stadium. Following their relegation in the 1987–88 season this was their fifth season in the second tier of Swiss football.

Overview

Pre-season
Friedel Rausch was appointed as new trainer, following Karl Odermatt and Bruno Rahmen. The duo had taken over ad interim after Ernst-August Künnecke had been sacked toward the end of the previous season.  After missing promotion during the last four seasons, the club's repeated priority aim was to return to the top flight of Swiss football.

A number of players left the squad. Robert Kok, who had only been with the club the previous season, retired from active football. Three players moved on to Germany; Mourad Bounoua transferred to TuS Celle, Maximilian Heidenreich and Thomas Schweizer both moved on to SC Freiburg. Other players transferred within the Swiss League, Walter Bernhard transferred to Fribourg, Gilbert Epars transferred to Urania Genève Sport and Boris Mancastroppa to Schaffhausen. A few other players stepped shorter, ending their professional careers and continuing as amateurs with local clubs; Miodrag Đurđević went to SG Lörrach-Stetten, Martin Thalmann to FC Riehen and Vittorio Gottardi to SC Dornach. Both Roger Glanzmann and Rocco Verrelli left the club because their contracts were not prolonged, but both also continued as amateurs.

In the other direction Christian Reinwald joined from Chur as the new second goalkeeper. Then there were two transfers from Germany, Dirk Lellek transferred in from VfL Osnabrück and Ørjan Berg transferred in from 1860 Munich. Within the Swiss League, Mario Uccella joined from Winterthur, Marco Walker from Lugano and Pierre-André Schürmann from Lausanne-Sport. Two players joined from Xamax, Admir Smajić transferred in and Frédéric Chassot on loan. Patrick Rahmen returned to his club of origin from Young Boys and youngster Gaetano Giallanza signed his first professional contract, coming from Old Boys. Two other youngsters advanced from Basel's youth team, Pasquale D'Ambrosio and Cedric Jakob.

Domestic league
The 24 teams in the Nationalliga B were divided into two groups, an East and a West group. Both groups would first play a qualification round. Then in the second stage the tops six teams of each group and the last four teams of the Nationalliga A would play a promotion/relegation round, also divided into two separate groups. The top two teams in each of these groups would play in the top flight the next season. Basel were assigned to the West group, together with local rivals Old Boys. In the two local duals, Basel won both games and both with 3–0. Basel ended the Qualifying Phase in second position in the league table. In the 22 matches Basel totaled 36 points with 16 victories, four draws and two defeats. The team scored 54 goals and conceded only 10.

Basel thus qualified for the promotion stage and were assigned to group A. Further teams assigned to this group from the Nationalliga B were Delémont, Chênois, Luzern, Locarno and Wil. Assigned to this group and fighting against relegation from the Nationalliga A were Bulle and Grasshopper Club. Basel ended the promotion stage in a very disappointing fourth position in the league table. The 14 matches resulted in seven victories, four draws and three defeats with 18 points, scoring 25, conceding 17 goals. Therefore, Basel missed promotion again.

Swiss Cup
Basel entered the Swiss Cup in the second round. Here they were drawn away from home against lower-tier local team FC Baudepartement Basel. André Sitek scored a hat-trick between the 12th and the 31st minute as Basel won 6–0. In the third round they were drawn at home to local rivals Old Boys and this was won 4–0. Basel were drawn away against lower-tier SC Young Fellows Juventus in the third round and this was won 3–0. In the round of 16 they were again drawn at home, also against a lower-tier team, FC Savièse. All four games were won without the team conceding a single goal. However, in the quarterfinals Basel played at home against higher-tier Xamax. Because this match ended with a 2–3 defeat they were eliminated from the competition. Xamax were defeated in the semi-final by Lugano, who went on to win the final 4–1 against Grasshopper Club.

Players 

 
 
 
 
 
 
 
 

 
 
 

 

 

 
 
 

Players who left the squad

Results 
Legend

Friendly matches

Pre-season

Winter break

Nationalliga B

Qualifying Phase West

League table

Promotion/relegation Phase Group A

League table

Swiss Cup

See also
 History of FC Basel
 List of FC Basel players
 List of FC Basel seasons

References

Sources
 Rotblau: Jahrbuch Saison 2015/2016. Publisher: FC Basel Marketing AG. 
 Die ersten 125 Jahre / 2018. Publisher: Josef Zindel im Friedrich Reinhardt Verlag, Basel. 
 The FCB squad 1992–93 at fcb-archiv.ch
 1992–93 at RSSSF

External links
 FC Basel official site

FC Basel seasons
Basel